The Tufveson House is a Queen Anne style house in Minot, North Dakota. It was listed on the National Register of Historic Places in 1984.

The house was built in 1900. The builder of the home was Nils Tufveson, an immigrant from Sweden.
Nils Tufveson (1856-1925) was born  at  Eslöv in Skåne, Sweden. He was married to  Kersti Olsdotter Tufveson (1860-1919) who was born at Simrishamn in  Skåne, Sweden. Tufveson was one of the early settlers of the Souris River Valley, arriving in the area by 1884.

References

Houses on the National Register of Historic Places in North Dakota
Queen Anne architecture in North Dakota
Houses completed in 1900
Buildings and structures in Minot, North Dakota
Swedish-American culture in North Dakota
Houses in Ward County, North Dakota
National Register of Historic Places in Ward County, North Dakota
1900 establishments in North Dakota